Crosby Railway Station (Manx: Stashoon Raad Yiarn Valley ny Croshey) was an intermediate stop on the Isle of Man Railway; it served the village of Crosby in the Isle of Man and was a stopping place on a line that ran between Douglas and Peel.  It was part of the island's first railway line.

Description
This station boasted its own cattle dock, siding and station building, the latter of which was made to the same design as the station building at St John's.  The station last operated in 1968.  At the eastern end of the station, beyond the points of the passing loop, the line crossed the road to Ellerslie Depot and the stone crossing hut is all that survives of the railway infrastructure today.

Closure
When the line closed, a group of lads from Merseyside removed the station nameboard and to this day it is believed to hang on the wall of the scout headquarters in the Liverpool suburb that shares its name.

Environs
The site of the former station is now on the perimeter of the local playing fields at the bottom of a valley that shortly thereafter climbs steeply to the old school house, now a languages centre.  The local Methodist chapel is located on the same road and since the line's closure a cricket pavilion and meeting rooms have been erected nearby.  The public toilets for the village and war memorial also stand at the end of the road, which adjoins the world-famous T.T. course at its end.

Route

See also
 Isle of Man Railway stations
 Crosby

References
 James I.C. Boyd Isle Of Man Railway, Volume 3, The Routes & Rolling Stock (1996) 
 Norman Jones Scenes from the Past: Isle of Man Railway (1994) 
 Robert Hendry Rails in the Isle of Man: A Colour Celebration (1993) 
 A.M Goodwyn Manx Transport Kaleidoscope, 2nd Edition (1995)

Sources
 [Isle of Man Steam Railway Supporters' Association]

Railway stations in the Isle of Man
Railway stations opened in 1873
Railway stations closed in 1968